Film London is London's film and media agency – sustaining, promoting and developing London as a major international film-making and film cultural capital. This includes all the screen industries based in London – film, television, video, commercials and new interactive media. Film London is one of nine regional screen agencies throughout the United Kingdom. The not-for-profit organisation is supported by the BFI and the Mayor of London.  Film London also receives significant support from Arts Council England London and ScreenSkills.

Aims and objectives
Film London aims to ensure London has a thriving film sector that enriches the capital's businesses and its people.

Film London's objectives are to:

 Grow the film industry in London
 Maximise investment in London through film
 Sustain London's film culture
 Promote London to the world through film
 Engage with audiences through the medium of story telling

Film London's strategic priorities are to:

 Maximise inward investment by maintaining and strengthening London's position as a film-friendly city
 Increase investment and boost employment in London's film sector by providing partnership funding for production, distribution and exhibition across all media
 Develop talent and the competitiveness of the industry by investing in training
 Maximise access to the capital's film culture by helping audiences to discover film in all its diversity.
 Promote London through film by working in partnership with a wide range of stakeholders
 Maximise opportunities provided by London 2012 and its legacy to strengthen the capital's film industry and film culture

Activities
Film London's activities include:

 Comprehensive information on London locations and production services, as well as practical advice and support to film-makers shooting in the city
 Investment in new and established film-makers through a range of production schemes
 Supporting training and business development activities
 Developing audiences and access provision across the film and media sector
 Showcasing London films and talent
 Domestic and international tourism initiatives
 Promoting London on an international stage as an attractive base for film and media production

Organisation

History
Film London subsumed the roles of two previously existing organizations: the London Film Commission (LFC) and the London Film Video and Development Agency (LFVDA). Film London was formed on 17 March 2003 under the aegis of the UK Film Council and the London Development Agency, the Mayor of London's development arm.

Sandy Lieberson was appointed as chairman of the board in March 2003, and chief executive Adrian Wootton joined in May that year. The agency was officially launched in April 2004.

Current networks
In 2005, Film London in partnership with Arts Council England, established the Film London Artists' Moving Image Network (FLAMIN). FLAMIN supports London-based artists working in moving image in all its forms; whether film, video, digital, animation or new technologies and for installation, cinema, gallery exhibition, the public realm or broadcast.

Film London Artists' Moving Image Network works in partnership with various organisations to provide: funding, events, seminars, advice, surgeries, residencies, training and workshops.

The FLAMIN website provides information and listings tailored to meet the needs of artists working with the moving image.

Film London Microwave, a micro-budget feature film fund, launched in 2006. The scheme challenges film-makers to shoot a full-length feature film for up to £100,000 with cash and in-kind support.

Microwave is open to film-makers working in documentary, fiction, animation, and to artists working with the moving image.

Accompanying the scheme is a web-based resource – Microwave Online. The website outlines the details of all projects supported through Film London Microwave, and also offers current news in the independent film-making sector, as well as educational resources.

Productions
There have been several notable shorts and features that have been produced with support and funding from Film London:
 Lilting (film) (Film London Microwave 2012)
 Strawberry Fields (Film London Microwave 2012)
 Ill Manors by Plan B (musician) (Film London Microwave 2011)
 Shifty by Eran Creevy (Film London Microwave 2008)
 Mum & Dad by Steven Sheil (Film London Microwave 2008)
 Derek by Isaac Julien (Film London Artists’ Moving Image Network 2008)
 Daisy's Last Stand by Gary Grant (North London Film Fund 2008)
 Theda by Georgina Starr (LAFVA 2006)
 Gallivant by Andrew Kötting (LAFVA 2006)
 Care by Corinna Faith (PULSE Plus 2005)
 Cubs by Tom Harper (PULSE 2005)
 Elephant Palm Tree by Kara Miller (PULSE 2003)
 Küba by Kutluğ Ataman (LAFVA 2004)
 Nine ½ Minutes by Josh Appignanesi and Misha Manson Smith (PULSE 2003)
 Rank by David Yates (London Production Fund 2002)

Film London board
The Film London Board, led by Chairman David Parfitt, is made up of 10 industry professionals – each bringing different areas of knowledge and expertise to the organisation.
John Akomfrah, award-winning film-maker
Dr Emily Caston, award-winning senior producer
Stuart Comer, Curator of Film at Tate Modern
Edward Fletcher, co-founder and managing director of Soda Pictures
Nadine Marsh-Edwards, film and TV producer
Martin Pilgrim, previous chief executive of London Councils (formerly the Association of London Government)
Tim Richards, co-founder and CEO of Vue Entertainment
Lisbeth Savill, head of the Media, Communications and Technology Group at Olswang
Rob Wilkerson, CEO of Target Media Group
Stephen Woolley, award-winning film producer

References

External links
 Film London Homepage
 Film London Artists’ Moving Image Network
 Film London Microwave
  London’s Screen Archives YouTube channel

Cultural organisations based in London
Film organisations in the United Kingdom